Maser is a comune (municipality) in the Province of Treviso in the Italian region Veneto, located about  northwest of Venice and about  northwest of Treviso.

The municipality of Maser contains the frazioni (subdivisions, mainly villages and hamlets) Coste, Crespignaga, and Madonna della Salute.

Maser borders the following municipalities: Altivole, Asolo, Caerano di San Marco, Cornuda, Monfumo.

Maser is notable for being the place of death of the architect Andrea Palladio, creator of the famous Palladian style of architecture. Villa Barbaro in Maser is one of his finest projects.
Towards the end of his life, Palladio received the opportunity to build a church, the Tempietto Barbaro, to serve the Villa Barbaro and the village of Maser.

Demographic evolution

References

Cities and towns in Veneto